Aliciella leptomeria (formerly Gilia leptomeria) is a species of flowering plant in the phlox family known by the common names sand gilia and Great Basin gilia. It is native to the Western United States, where it grows in many types of habitat, such as the sagebrush of the Great Basin and in the Mojave Desert.

It is a small herb producing a thin, branching stem up to about 23 centimeters tall. It is coated in glandular hairs. Several deeply lobed leaves 1 to 6 centimeters long are located in a basal rosette at ground level around the stem. There are smaller, unlobed leaves along the stem. The inflorescence produces one to three flowers, each about half a centimeter wide with a thread-thin tube. The corolla is purple-stained white, the throat is yellowish, and the tube is purple.

External links
Jepson Manual Treatment
Photo gallery

leptomoria
Flora of the California desert regions
Flora of the Great Basin
Flora without expected TNC conservation status